Euderces cribellatus is a species of beetle in the family Cerambycidae. It was described by Henry Walter Bates in 1885 and is known from Panama and Costa Rica.

References

Euderces
Beetles described in 1885
Beetles of Central America
Taxa named by Henry Walter Bates